Teerasak Poeiphimai (born 21 September 2002) is a Thai professional footballer who plays as a striker for Thai League 1 club Port.

International career
On 15 October 2021, Teerasak was called up to the Thailand U23 national team for the 2022 AFC U-23 Asian Cup qualification. In February 2022, Teerasak represented Thailand U23 at the 2022 AFF U-23 Youth Championship in Cambodia. He scored his first international goal on 16 February 2022 against Singapore.

International goals

Under-23

Honours

International
Thailand U-23
 2022 AFF U-23 Championship: Runner up
 Southeast Asian Games  Silver Medal: 2021

Individual
AFF U-23 Championship Top Scorer (1): 2022

References

External links

 

2002 births
Living people
Teerasak Poeiphimai
Teerasak Poeiphimai
Teerasak Poeiphimai
Teerasak Poeiphimai
Association football forwards
Teerasak Poeiphimai
Competitors at the 2021 Southeast Asian Games
Teerasak Poeiphimai